Schunke is a surname. Notable people with this surname include:

 Charlie Schunke (1879–1924), Australian football player
 Ernie Schunke (1882–1922), Australian football player
 Jonathan Schunke (born 1987), Argentinian football player
 Ludwig Schuncke (1810–1834), German pianist and composer [sometimes spelt Louis Schunke]